The 2021 More Europe leadership election was a congressional primary election which took place on 16, 17 and 18 July 2021 at Rome to elect the new party leadership.

The candidates to the Secretary were the outgoing Secretary and former MEP Benedetto Della Vedova and the former president of the think-tank FutureDem, Giulio del Balzo. With 76.7% of the votes, Benedetto Della Vedova was elected as Secretary of More Europe for a second term.

Background

Tabacci and Fusacchia's departure
After the controversy that arose following the accusation that paid supporters voted for the Tabacci list during the first congress, which resulted in Marco Cappato's exit from More Europe, the party found itself embattled again following the birth of the Conte II government. The confidence in the Conte II government was voted by all three parliamentarians, namely MP Riccardo Magi (who later withdrew it), Alessandro Fusacchia and Senator Bruno Tabacci, while the leadership of More Europe wanted to stay at the opposition. After a few months, first Tabacci and then Fusacchia left the party, objecting the choice of staying at the opposition of the Conte II cabinet. However, since at least three deputies are needed in the Chamber of Deputies to form a sub-group of the Mixed Group, Tabacci and Fusacchia temporarily stayed in the same sub-group of More Europe to prevent it from being dissolved – until Magi and Bonino made an agreement to have a single sub-group with Action in late 2020. The departure of Fusacchia and Tabacci, who stood for the Assembly in 2019 with one list each, caused the reduction of the Assembly's membership from 100 to 71 members due to the impossibility of being able to elect new Assembly members to replace the leavers, as they had run out of eligible candidates on those lists.

Meanwhile, former Economic Development Minister Carlo Calenda founded a new party, Action, and asked the leadership of More Europe to merge the two parties. Della Vedova, on the other hand, was more reluctant and would opt for a federation, similar to what the Margherita was in its early years. The two parties eventually joined the scientific committee of "Program for Italy," chaired by Carlo Cottarelli, and which also included Liberal Democratic Alliance for Italy, The Liberals and the Italian Republican Party, with the goal of developing common political proposals.

Frictions between Benedetto Della Vedova and some prominent figures such as Piercamillo Falasca and Carmelo Palma – who were on Della Vedova's side since he founded the Liberal Reformers party back in 2005 – grew over time, and the latter over time challenged Della Vedova on his opposition to the federation with Action, which they instead advocated. The split caused a reversal of positions in the Assembly, and with Falasca and Palma's move to the opposition, along with the loss of the Assembly members who had spilt with Tabacci, Della Vedova no longer had a majority in the Assembly.

Tresaurer's vote of no-confidence and Bonino's departure
At the Assembly meeting on Dec. 6, 2020, in preparation for the convening of the upcoming congress, which was initially to be held in spring, Treasurer Valerio Federico reported that the new platform adopted by the party, NationBuilder, could not track down payments made by credit cards, and the introduction of the possibility to enroll to the party by postal slips complicated the situation. This meant that the same payment method could be used to enroll multiple people en masse.

The opposition close to Falasca and Silvja Manzi challenged Valerio Federico for never having communicated this information to the Assembly, while the treasurer defended himself by claiming that revealing this information would have compromised the enrollment phase for the congress. The treasurer was also accused of validating collective enrollments consisting of at least 4 people for the same payment method, which is against the provisions of Article 5.2 of the Statute – a charge that was denied by the treasurer, arguing that nominations are invalidated only if there are additional criteria, not only therefore the alleged lack of individuality of the payment.

This led in the postponement of the approval of the Congress rules (which require an approval of the two thirds of the members of the Assembly) and consequently the postponement of the congress itself, and an exchange of accusations between the two factions: Fabrizio Ferrandelli, who had been elected to the Assembly on the list led by Bruno Tabacci but remained in More Europe, challenged Falasca on the increase in registrations in Campania, his home region, while Falasca challenged Ferrandelli on the collective registrations made by postal transfer in Palermo, Ferrandelli's hometown. Soon there was a stalemate to establish mutually accepted criteria for enrollment.

The Assembly meanwhile doubted the work of the Guarantee Committee, which resigned en masse on January, and finally challenged the Treasurer during the March 13 assembly with a motion of no-cofidence passed by 38 votes and 3 votes against it out of 71 Assembly members. Valerio Federico criticized the motion of no-confidence arguing that it was a political maneuver. Following Federico's vote of no-confidence, Emma Bonino in the assembly held on March 14 contested the decision, announcing she was leaving More Europe.

Bonino contested the presentation of an anonymous document that envisioned a united agreement to elect a collegial secretariat that would include majority and opposition, objecting also that the document claimed that its approval would result in the withdrawal of the motion of no-confidence for the treasurer. Subsequently, Della Vedova resigned as secretary of More Europe, thus triggering an extraordinary congress to be held within three months according to the Statute, while at the same time he announced his candidacy for the next congress. Riccardo Magi disputed Emma Bonino's version, claiming that that document he had helped write had been suggested by Della Vedova himself to overcome the impasse and to avoid the motion of no-confidence to the treasurer.

Procedure

Timetable

Candidates

Secretary

Assembly Lists

Endorsements

Giulio del Balzo

Results

Secretary

President

Delegates

Assembly

Aftermath
During the last day of the congress, Emma Bonino, greeted by a standing ovation from the audience, returned to the party, saying that "I'm glad we got out of this introverted dynamic with the celebration of this congress, which was really beautiful and successful".

In December 2021, More Europe and European Italy reached a court settlement to end the dispute, waiving the actions taken in court and agreeing to a payment of €57,000 from More Europe to European Italy.

References

More Europe leadership election
Political party leadership elections in Italy
More Europe leadership election